Sevalaya is a registered charitable organisation in India. Sevalaya means Temple of Service.  It runs an orphanage in the village of Kasuva near Thiruninravur about 40 km west of Chennai, Tamil Nadu in southern India. It is also engaged in activities for the welfare of the poor and the deprived.

Sevalaya runs a free school (recognised by the State Government of Tamil Nadu) for the children at the orphanage and the surrounding village as well as a free medical centre, a free library, a goshala for cows, and an old age home for destitute senior men and women.  All the services are rendered to those in need with the help of philanthropic donations without any discrimination on the basis of caste, colour, religion, language, or gender. The organisation does not receive any grants from the government.

History and organisation
Inspired by the ideals and life of Mahatma Gandhi, Mahakavi Bharathiyar and Swami Vivekananda, V. Muralidharan, along with a group of colleagues formed the charitable trust Sevalaya. Initially a children’s home for poor, orphan and destitute children started functioning on 29 May 1988. The aim of the institution is to provide better opportunities to the poor, orphan and destitute children by fulfilling their basic needs of food, clothing and shelter and also providing value based education and medical care.

Activities
The activities of Sevalaya include Swami Vivekananda Boys Home and Mother Teresa Girls Home providing shelter to 130 orphan and destitute boys and girls from broken homes, Mahakavi Bharathiyar Higher Secondary School (recognised by Government of Tamil Nadu but unaided) providing free education through in vernacular to 1650 rural children including the residents of the Homes, Mahatma Gandhiji Medical Centre providing free medical care, Swami Vivekananda Free Library, Kasthurba Craft Centre providing free training in tailoring to rural women, Vinobhaji Goshala sheltering cows, and Sri Ramakrishna Paramahamsa Old Age Home sheltering 60 destitute senior citizens.

Swami Vivekananda Boys Home 
The Home provides the basic needs of food, clothing and shelter to the orphan children. The children are also provided with free education and medical facilities. At present there are 130 children in this home.

Mahakavi Bharathiyar Higher Secondary School
The school provides free education (no fees, free textbooks and free notebooks and 2 sets of free uniforms) to around 1450 children.  The 3000 families in the area are made up of mostly landless agricultural labourers and brick kiln workers, and most of the children are first generation school goers.  The free school has allowed many of these families to send their children for an education instead of taking them with them to work.

Mahatma Gandhiji Medical Centre
Mahatma Gandhiji Medical Centre run by Sevalaya provides free medical care to residents as well as villagers. This has allowed greater access to healthcare in the remote village as the nearest hospital is 6 km away.  Minor ailments are treated by the nurse at the centre. Medical camps are arranged almost once a month when teams of specialists from the city visit the institution and conduct check ups for the residents as well as the villagers. With a view to create an awareness about the alternative medical system and nature cure methods, siddha medical camps and nature cure camps are also held.

Swami Vivekananda Library & Reading Room
The library has a collection of over 10,000 books including the complete works of Mahatma Gandhi, Mahakavi Bharathi and Swami Vivekananda as well as many newspaper and magazine subscriptions. The library is open to all Sevalaya residents as well as the villagers for free. A mobile library is also sent to the villages nearby every Saturday to make the books available for reading to all the villagers.

Kasthurba Craft Centre
Craft education is a part of the school curriculum and the students are trained in various crafts like wire bag making, book binding, etc., The centre also conducts a free six months certificate course in tailoring for rural women.

Vinobhaji Goshala
The goshala (cow protection centre) shelters around 25 cows (both milk yielding and dry cows). The milk is consumed by the residents of the Orphan Home and the Old Age Home and excess is sold in nearby villages, with the marginal generated income being utilised for meeting the expenses of the institution. A Gobar gas Plant has been constructed which meets 90% of the fuel needs of the Old Age Home.  Organic manure is produced by vermin compost method. The manure is used in the kitchen garden maintained at Sevalaya and also marketed.

Sri Ramakrishna Paramahamsa Old Age Home
The Old Age Home provides shelter to poor and destitute old men and women. The residents are encouraged to involve themselves in simple activities like helping in the kitchen by cutting vegetables, watering the garden, etc.

References

External links
 Sevalaya
 

Hindu organizations
Charities based in India
Non-profit organisations based in India
Organisations based in Chennai
1988 establishments in Tamil Nadu
Organizations established in 1988